Kumara Raja is a 1978 Indian Telugu-language action film directed by P. Sambasiva Rao. The film stars Krishna, Jaya Prada, Satyanarayana, Jayanti and Latha. Krishna enacted triple roles of a wronged businessman, Rajasekhar and his estranged twin sons — Kumar and Raja. The film has musical score by K. V. Mahadevan. The film is a remake of the 1978 Kannada movie Shankar Guru.

Released on 6 October 1978 the film emerged as a major commercial success. Kotagiri Gopala Rao edited the film while V. S. R. Swamy handled the cinematography.

Plot

Cast

Soundtrack 
The film's soundtrack was scored and composed by K. V. Mahadevan.
 "Aagali Aagali"" — Balu, P. Susheela
 "Aggini Nenu" — Balu, Rama Krishna
 "Anuragadevatha" — Balu
 "Neemata Vinte" — Rama Krishna, P. Susheela
 "Seethakokka" — Balu
 "Vichukunna" — Balu, P. Susheela

References

External links 

1978 films
1978 action films
Telugu remakes of Kannada films
Twins in Indian films
Indian action films
1970s masala films
Films scored by K. V. Mahadevan
Films about twin brothers
1970s Telugu-language films